Rasi Salai is a district (amphoe) in the northern part of Sisaket province, northeastern Thailand.

Geography 
Neighboring districts are (from the north clockwise): Phanom Phrai of Roi Et province; Sila Lat of Sisaket Province; Maha Chana Chai and Kho Wang of Yasothon province; Yang Chum Noi, Mueang Sisaket, Uthumphon Phisai, and Bueng Bun of Sisaket; and Rattanaburi of Surin province.

The main river of the district is the Mun.

History 
The district was renamed from Khong to Rasi Salai in 1939.

The Rasi Salai Dam was built here in 1994 and unofficially decommissioned in July 2000 following devastation of local farming villages as documented by Living River Siam.

Administration 
The district is divided into 13 sub-districts (tambons), which are further subdivided into 190 villages (mubans). Mueang Khong is a township (thesaban tambon) and covers parts of tambon Mueang Khong. There are a further 13 tambon administrative organizations (TAO).

Missing numbers are tambons which now form Sila Lat District.

References

External links 
amphoe.com (Thai)

Rasi Salai